James Laidlaw Huggan (11 October 1888 – 16 September 1914) was a  rugby union player. He was killed in World War I at the First Battle of the Aisne.

Early life
James Huggan was born in Jedburgh on 11 October 1888. He was educated at Darlington Grammar School before reading medicine at the University of Edinburgh.

Rugby Union career

Amateur career

Huggan played for Jed-Forest. On moving to Edinburgh University to study he then played for Edinburgh University.

He then moved to play for London Scottish.

Provincial career

He played for the South of Scotland in 1910.

International career

He had taken part in the last rugby international before the war, the Calcutta Cup match at Inverleith (Edinburgh) in March 1914, scoring three tries in the game.

Military career

Huggan was a lieutenant of the Royal Army Medical Corps, attached to the 3rd Battalion Coldstream Guards. He is commemorated at La Ferté-sous-Jouarre memorial. He died two days after Ronald Simson, another Scottish player, who was the first rugby international to die in the conflict, and who was also at the Aisne.

References

 Bath, Richard (ed.) The Scotland Rugby Miscellany (Vision Sports Publishing Ltd, 2007 )

External links
 Commonwealth War Graves database

1888 births
1914 deaths
Scotland international rugby union players
British military personnel killed in World War I
British Army personnel of World War I
Royal Army Medical Corps officers
Jed-Forest RFC players
South of Scotland District (rugby union) players
Edinburgh University RFC players
London Scottish F.C. players
Rugby union wings
Rugby union players from Scottish Borders